Landscape in the Mist (translit. Topio stin omichli) is a 1988 Greek film directed by Theo Angelopoulos. The film was selected as the Greek entry for the Best Foreign Language Film at the 62nd Academy Awards, but was not accepted as a nominee. A critics' poll by the Village Voice included it in the 100 Best Films of the 20th Century list. The film is the third installment in Angelopoulos' Trilogy of Silence, following Voyage to Cythera (1984) and The Beekeeper (1986).

Plot
Pubescent Voula (Tania Palaiologou) and her five-year-old brother Alexandros (Michalis Zeke) want to see their father, whom they have never met before. Their mother tells them he lives in Germany and so Voula and Alexandros one day secretly leave their home to find him. They go to the Athens Railway Station and try to use the Germany Express, but are removed from the train for not having a ticket. A police officer takes them to a distant uncle, who convinces the officer that the children do not have a father in Germany. He informs him that their mother lied to them, to prevent them from knowing the truth: that they have different fathers and are simply the results of one-night stands. Although Voula and Alexandros eavesdrop on the conversation, they still believe their mother and believe the uncle is lying. When a blizzard suddenly hits the village and no more attention is paid to them, the children manage to escape.

They continue their journey on foot and eventually meet a young man named Orestis (Stratos Tzortzoglou), who broke down with his bus. He offers to take them with him, and the children accept the offer. Orestis is the driver of a traveling theater troupe playing a piece about Greek history. Recently the troupe has been struggling with declining audience numbers, due to people searching for easier distraction.

As the path of Orestis splits from theirs, the children leave the troupe and look for different means of transportation to Germany. They manage to find a truck driver (Vassilis Kolovos), willing to take them with him. Later, while Alexandros is asleep, the driver rapes Voula, and flees afterwards, shocked by his own actions. Alexandros and Voula soon reach another train station, where they again try to travel by train. When they spot the ticket inspector, they escape just in time before being caught. They bump into Orestis again, who takes them with him on his motorcycle. Meanwhile, Orestis' theater troupe breaks up and the members begin to sell their various requisites. Orestis takes Voula and Alexandros to an empty beach cafe and they walk the promenade with him. Suddenly, the children witness a huge marble hand held by a helicopter emerge from the sea. The index finger of the hand is broken off.

Due to his impending military service, Orestis is forced to sell his motorcycle. He later meets the buyer again in a bar, and it is implied that he has sexual relations with him. Voula is disappointed in Orestis, having developed a crush in him herself, and the children leave again. Orestis later searches for them, and finds them on a deserted, newly constructed highway section. He takes Voula into his arms and starts consoling the crying girl: "The first time, it's always as if you're dying." They break up with Orestis again, this time for good. At another train station, a soldier gives Voula money to buy train tickets and the children again board a train for Germany. They exit shortly before the passport control at the border. Outside, they realize that the border is formed by a river, and use a small boat to cross it. Suddenly, shots are fired by border guards and a tree begins to emerge from the fog. As the fog begins to clear, Voula and Alexandros run for the tree and embrace it.

Cast
 Michalis Zeke as Alexandros
 Tania Palaiologou as Voula
 Stratos Tzortzoglou as Orestis	
 Vassilis Kolovos as truck driver		
 Ilias Logothetis as Seagull	
 Michael Giannatos as train station guardian	
 Toula Stathopoulou as woman in police station	
 Gerasimos Skiadaressis as soldier	
 Dimitris Kaberidis as uncle
 Tassos Palatzidis as train conductor

Production
Angelopoulos stated he once read in the newspaper about two children embarking on a journey to Germany to find their father. He was so impressed by this strong desire to find the father, that the idea of producing a film about it came to his mind. Landscape in the Mist was Angelopoulos' first film to be distributed in the United States, being distributed by New Yorker Films.

Orestis and his traveling theater troupe are a reference to Angelopoulos' earlier film The Travelling Players (1975).

Soundtrack
The soundtrack, containing traces of romantic music and stressed by the oboe, was composed by Eleni Karaindrou. Karaindrou stated the impetuous children strongly reminded her of the romantic escapes from earlier times, which is why she wanted the soundtrack to contain traces of Mendelssohn and Franck. When it came to the selection of the fitting instrument, she chose the oboe, because it is romantic and screams at the same time.

Reception

Accolades

See also
 List of submissions to the 62nd Academy Awards for Best Foreign Language Film
 List of Greek submissions for the Academy Award for Best Foreign Language Film

References

External links

Essay on Landscape in the Mist

1988 drama films
1980s drama road movies
1988 films
European Film Awards winners (films)
Films directed by Theodoros Angelopoulos
Films shot in Epirus
Films shot in Thessaloniki
Films set in Greece
1980s Greek-language films
Films with screenplays by Tonino Guerra
Films scored by Eleni Karaindrou
Greek drama films
Films based on newspaper and magazine articles
Films about siblings